Thomas Leon Cochran (April 13, 1924 – January 19, 2010) was an American football fullback in the National Football League for the Washington Redskins. Born in Birmingham, Alabama, he played college football at Auburn University. He died in Ft. Walton Beach, Florida in January 2010.

References

1924 births
2010 deaths
Players of American football from Birmingham, Alabama
American football fullbacks
Auburn Tigers football players
Washington Redskins players